Tiako I Madagasikara (TIM) is a political party in Madagascar founded on July 3 2002, to support President Marc Ravalomanana. After the parliamentary election held on September 23, 2007, it was the largest party in the National Assembly of Madagascar, with 106 of 127 seats. The party is located in MAGRO Ankorondrano, Antananarivo. Ravalomanana was re-elected with 55.79% in the December 2006 presidential election.

Solofonantenaina Razoarimihaja was the President of TIM from 2002 to 2007. On October 12, 2007, he was succeeded by Yvan Randriasandratriniony, who became the Interim National President. Randriasandratriniony was officially elected as President of TIM on May 21, 2008, at the party's second national congress, while Ivohasina Razafimahefa was elected as its Secretary-General.

Ravalomanana led his personal movement in the 2013 Malagasy general election.

Electoral history

National Assembly elections

Presidential elections

References

Political parties in Madagascar
Political parties established in 2002
2002 establishments in Madagascar